The Ulakhan-Chistay Range is a range of mountains in far North-eastern Russia. Administratively the range is part of the Sakha Republic of the Russian Federation.

A section of the range, including the upper course of the Moma River basin, as well as the  Buordakh Massif with Mount Pobeda, is part of the Moma Natural Park, one of the protected areas of Russia.

Geography

The Ulakhan-Chistay Range is the highest subrange of the Chersky Range system. It is parallel to the latter and separated from it by a wide intermontane basin, where the Ulakhan-Chistay River and the Moma River flow from the southeast and join the Indigirka. From the southwest the range is bound by the Erikit River, a left tributary of the Moma, and the Nera Plateau, beyond which rises the Tas-Kystabyt, also known as (Sarychev Range).

It is the highest mountain of the Chersky Range and also the highest of Yakutia.

See also 
 Chersky-Kolyma mountain tundra

References

External links

Chersky Range